Landau (Pfalz) Hauptbahnhof (Landau (Pfalz) main station) is the centre of public transport in the city of Landau in the German state of Rhineland-Palatinate.

History 
The history of the station begins in 1855, when the Palatine Maximilian Railway was opened on the Neustadt–Landau–Winden–Wissembourg route. In 1872, a new station building was built in the Romanesque revival style, replacing the original timber building. In the same year, the Lower Queich Valley Railway (Untere Queichtalbahn) was opened from Germersheim to Landau. The Queich Valley Railway (Queichtalbahn), connecting Landau, Annweiler, Biebermühle and Zweibrücken, was opened in 1874/5.
	
Long distance trains ran in all directions, on the Amsterdam–Bingerbrück–Bad Kreuznach–Neustadt–Landau–Strasbourg–Basel route and on the Munich–Ulm–Stuttgart–Bruchsal–Germersheim–Landau–Biebermühle–Zweibrücken–Saarbrücken route.

In 1898 the branch line to Herxheim was opened. The Palatine Overland Railway (Pfälzer Oberlandbahn), an overland tramway (interurban) running from Neustadt to Landau, was completed in 1913 to the station, but it was closed to Landau in 1953.

The station building was completely destroyed in World War II. A temporary structure existed for several years until the current station building was built. In the early 1980s, the Lower Queich Valley Railway and the branch line to Herxheim were closed. In the 1990s, the operations depot and the smaller marshalling yard were closed.

In 2010, the station was renovated, the platforms was modernised and lifts were installed.

Operations 
The main station consists of five platform tracks: tracks 1, 2 and 5 are served by trains on the Queich Valley Railway, although tracks 1 and 5 are rarely used. Track 3 and 4 are used by trains on the Maximilian Railway. Services run in each direction on the Maximilian Railway three times an hour, a Regional-Express service runs on the Karlsruhe–Neustadt route, a Regionalbahn service runs on the Neustadt–Wissembourg route and a Regionalbahn service runs on the Karlsruhe–Neustadt route. Once an hour a train runs on the Queich Valley Railway.

On Sundays and public holidays three pairs of regional long distance services operate: the Elsass-Express from Mainz to Wissembourg, the Weinstraßenexpress from Wissembourg to Koblenz and the Rheintalexpress from Karlsruhe to Koblenz.

Buses operate to the suburbs from a central bus station located in the station forecourt.

In the station building there is a restaurant and a kiosk. On 2 September 2010 a new travel centre opened.

References

External links 
 

Railway stations in Rhineland-Palatinate
Railway stations in Germany opened in 1855
Landau